{{DISPLAYTITLE:C21H23NO5}}
The molecular formula C21H23NO5 (molar mass: 369.41 g/mol, exact mass: 369.1576 u) may refer to:

 Allocryptopine
 Cryptopine
 Heroin, or diacetylmorphine

Molecular formulas